

Geospatial Authentication 
A software package that has been designed to allow authentication for determining if the rover(s) is/are within a set of boundaries or a specific area to access critical geospatial information by using GPS signal structures as a means to authenticate mobile devices into a network wirelessly and in real-time has been developed. The advantage lies in that the system only allows those with designated geospatial boundaries or areas into the server.

The Geospatial Authentication software has two parts — Server and Client. The server software is a virtual private network (VPN) developed in Linux operating system using Perl programming language. The server can be a stand-alone VPN server or can be combined with other applications and services. The client software is a GUI Windows CE software, or Mobile Graphical Software, that allows users to authenticate into a network. The purpose of the client software is to pass the needed satellite information to the server for authentication.

This work was done by Stacey D. Lyle of Geospatial Research Innovation Design for NASA's Stennis Space Center.

External links
   
 NASA Tech Briefs Source of Research

Authentication methods